Newclose County Cricket Ground is the county cricket ground for the Isle of Wight, located between Newport and Blackwater. Several open days were held in September 2008 on which special matches were to take place.

The ground is currently registered to host First Class County professional standard.  The ground was opened by Mike Gatting.

The cricket ground is also used as a conference and wedding venue.

References

External links
 

Cricket grounds on the Isle of Wight
Sports venues completed in 2008
Hampshire County Cricket Club